A special election to the United States House of Representatives for Illinois's 21st congressional district was held August 9, 1988.

The winning candidate would serve briefly in the United States House of Representatives to represent Illinois in the 100th Congress until the General election on November 8, 1988.

Background 
On April 22, 1988, Incumbent U.S. Representative Melvin Price died of cancer after 22 terms. A special election was held to fill the vacancy caused by his death.

Democratic Primary

Candidates

Nominee 
Jerry Costello, St. Clair County Board chairman

Eliminated in Primary 
Pete Fields, former Madison County Auditor and candidate for this seat in 1986
Mike Mansfield, political activist
Steve Maragides, political activist

Results

Republican Primary

Candidates

Nominee 
 Robert Gaffner, nominee for this seat in 1982, 1984, and 1986 and candidate for Illinois's 24th congressional district in 1972

Results

General election

See also 
 United States House of Representatives elections, 1984
 United States House of Representatives elections, 1986

References 

Illinois 1988 01
Illinois 1988 01
1988 01 Special
Illinois 01 Special
United States House of Representatives 01 Special
United States House of Representatives 1988 01